Real Time: Royal Festival Hall, London, 06.05.05 is a live album by Van der Graaf Generator, released in 2007 on Fie! Records (the label owned by the group's singer and principal songwriter Peter Hammill). It contains the entire recording of the group's reunion concert at the Royal Festival Hall in London, England on 6 May 2005. The album includes at least one song from every album released between 1970-1976, plus their 2005 reunion album Present. Nothing is included from 1969's Aerosol Grey Machine and The Quiet Zone/The Pleasure Dome, released in 1977 after Hugh Banton and David Jackson left the group. The album also contains "(In the) Black Room", a song performed live by Van der Graaf Generator in 1972 (a rehearsal recording was released on the collection Time Vaults); following the band's August 1972 breakup, it was released on Peter Hammill's 1973 solo album Chameleon in the Shadow of the Night, with Banton, Evans and Jackson all performing on the track.

The Japanese release of the album includes a bonus disc of three songs recorded live at the reunion tour that followed the Royal Festival Hall concert, plus one track of improvisation recorded while the group were soundchecking ("Gibberish").

Track listing

Disc One 

(*) Peter Hammill solo album.

Disc Two

Bonus tracks on the Japanese edition (released on Strange Days Records)

Personnel 
Van der Graaf Generator
 Peter Hammill – vocals, guitar, pianos
 David Jackson – saxophones, flute
 Hugh Banton – organ, bass pedals
 Guy Evans – drums

References

External links 
 Van der Graaf Generator - Real Time: Royal Festival Hall, London, 06.05.05 (2007) album review by François Couture, credits & releases at AllMusic.com
 
 

Real Time
2007 live albums
Live progressive rock albums